The All-China Journalists Association (ACJA), previously known as the 'Chinese Young Journalist Association', was established in Shanghai on November 8, 1937. November 8 now marks 'National Journalists Day' in China. The society was established by Chinese wartime reporter Fan Changjiang and later organized and sponsored by the Chinese Communist Party (CCP). On September 15, 1949, the All China Journalist Association became the first Chinese media association to be formally recognized by, and integrated into, the International Federation of Journalists.

Membership in the association is required for all professional journalists in China as overseen by the Propaganda Department of the Chinese Communist Party. There are over 217 rural and industrial member organisations in the association, encompassing over 1 million individuals in the media industry in China. The All-China Journalists Association is also a member of the Belt and Road News Network, assisting in the network's establishment in 2017.

History

Founding members

Fan Changjiang 
Fan Changjiang's career in journalism gained domestic notoriety in China during the Sino-Japanese war, attributed to his work as a war correspondent in regional China. During this period, he made observations of poverty in rural China in his book ‘The Northwest Corner of China’ (Zhongguo de Xibei Jiao), espousing his melancholy to see "bare-footed children…bound-footed women…plodding along’ on the “Refugee Trail".

Fan Changjiang promoted engagement with, and development of, the journalistic profession in rural communities to increase the visibility of minority groups and their diverse experiences during the war and under the existing government. Changjiang became disillusioned with the Nationalist government during the Sino-Japanese war attributed to their perceived disregard for rural communities, and later aligned himself with the CCP.

The Chinese journalist strongly advocated for transforming media practices in China, esteeming objective, factual reporting compared to commentarial pieces in inaccessible language created by his predecessors. Fan Changjiang launched the All-China Journalist Association to manifest this ideological shift, creating an organisation where techniques, styles and good reporting practices could be monitored and imparted upon reporters from localities across China and amongst China's various ethnic groups.

Fan Changjiang also participated in opening the ‘Reporters Hostel’ to create a physical location where reporters could collectively gather and share practices and develop ideas. In honour of Fan Changjiang's contribution to the development of journalism and reporting in China, the All-China Journalist Association established the ‘Fan Changjiang Journalist Award’, the most prestigious journalist award in the nation.

Organisation Structure

Executive Appointment Process 
Board members of the All-China Journalist Association are appointed every five years and are typically high-ranking members of Chinese media institutions, domestically renowned reporters, notable public figures, and well-regarded editors.

President

Zhang Yannong 
President Zhang Yannong was born in 1948, joining the ‘People's Daily’ in 1996, one of China's three main state-influenced media organisations. In 2008, he was appointed president of People's Daily. The president was formerly Vice Chairman of the All-China Journalist Association but recently was appointed to president, current as of January 2021.

Honorary President

Shao Huaze 
Honorary president Shao Huaze was born in the Zhejiang in 1933 as a member of the dominant Han Chinese ethnic group. Shao joined the People's Liberation Army in 1950 and later joined the CCP in 1957. In 1960, he graduated from the Department of Philosophy of the People's University with a postgraduate degree.

On June 4, 1989, Shao Huaze became the director of the People's Daily, the official mouthpiece of the Central Committee of the Chinese Communist Party. This appointment followed the removal of existing director Qian Liren and chief editor Tan Wenrui who both had expressed disenfranchisement with the Chinese Communist Party attributed to their involvement in the Tiananmen Square Massacre. In response to this, Shao publicly condemned journalists for spreading "misleading" information about the government.

Formally the president of the All-China Journalist society, Shao Huaze is now the honorary president. Shao Huaze has also been a member of the 15th, 14th and 9th General Committee and National Committee of the Chinese Communist Party.

Executive Vice President

Liu Zhengrong 
Liu Zhengrong is a member of the Chinese Communist party and the Deputy Chief of Internet Affairs at the Bureau of the State Council Information Office. He has been significantly involved in preventing access to ‘illicit’ materials entering China through establishment of online ‘firewall’ mechanisms. Liu also acted as vice-president of Xinhua News Agency and currently is also an Executive Secretary for the All-China Journalists Association.

Vice-Presidents 
The following is current of January 2021.

 Fu Hua
 Liu Chengan 
 Niu Yibing
 Sun Jilian 
 Tian Jin 
 Zhang Xiaoguo
 Zhang Yuxin

Executive Secretaries 
The following is current of January 2021.

 Liu Zhengrong
 Tian Yuhong
 Wu Jing
 Zhang Baixin

Departments

Domestic Work Department 
The Domestic Work Department works with communities to understand domestic rhetoric and sentiment. Journalists are able to produce authentic localised pieces within the guidelines of the Chinese Communist Party department of Propaganda.

International Liaison Department 
The International Liaison Department of the Chinese Communist Party works to establish connections and communications with foreign media organisations. This outreach program enables Chinese perspectives to be represented in international media as well as Chinese journalists to participate in the international community of journalists.

Taiwan, Hong Kong, and Macao Affairs Department 
The Taiwan, Hong Kong and Macao Affairs Department works with media organisations in these locations in an attempt to improve diplomatic communications and share media practice and ideology.

The General Office and Journalism Training Centre 
The General Office and Journalism Training Centre collaborates with the Chinese Communist Party, Journalism schools and university departments to connect journalists and organisations with students, as well as to spread methods and techniques associated with journalism. This department works in adherence to the 2013 ‘Joint Model’ of cooperation and collaboration between the Propaganda Department of the Central Committee and Chinese universities, so as to ensure the spread of CCP ideals and desired media output.

Member Organisations

Industrial Partner Organisations

China Photography Association 
Established in 1956, the Chinese Photography Association, renamed the Photojournalist Society of China in 1983, aims to provide a platform for photographers to express their interpretation of life in China through visual media focused on both natural landscapes and human stories. The association joined the All-China Journalist association upon its inception and was founded by the former head of the Xinhua News Photography Department, Shi Shaohua, who became the chairman of the new association. The photographer's association aimed to create photographic exhibitions, national and internationally recognised magazines and establish awards to recognise talented Chinese photographers.

Other Industrial Partners 
The following list is current as of January 2021.

 Chinese Automotive Journalists Association
 China City-Level Newspaper Society
 China Country-Level Newspaper Society
 China Digest News Society
 China Petroleum Journalists Association
 China Evening News Journalists Association
 Chinese News Cartoon Society
 Chinese Newspaper Supplements Society
 Chinese Posts and Telecommunications Journalist Association

Provincial Member Organisations 

 Anhui Journalists Association
 Chongqing Journalists Association
 Fujian Journalists Association
 Gansu Journalists Association
 Guangdong Journalists Association
 Guangxi Zhuang Autonomous Region Journalists Association
 Guizhou Journalists Association
 Hainan Journalists Association
 Hebei Journalists Association
 Heilongjiang Journalists Association
 Henan Journalists Association
 Hubei Journalists Association
 Hunan Journalists Association
 Inner Mongolia Autonomous Region Journalists Association
 Jiangsu Journalists Association
 Jiangxi Journalists Association
 Jilin Journalist Association
 Liaoning Journalists Association
 Ningxia Hui Autonomous Region Journalists Association
 Qinghai Journalists Association
 Shaanxi Journalists Association
 Shandong Journalists Association
 Shanghai Journalists Association
 Shanxi Journalists Association
 Sichuan Journalists Association
 Tianjin Journalists Association
 Tibet Autonomous Region Journalists Association
 Xinjiang Production and Construction Corps Journalist Association
 Xinjiang Uygur Autonomous Region Journalists Association
 Yunnan Journalists Association
 Zhejiang Journalists Association

Awards and Accolades

Fan Changjiang Award 
The Fan Changjiang Award is awarded to reporters, and is regarded as one of the two most recognised journalism awards in China.

Taofen Award 
The Taofen Award, named after Zou Taofen is dedicated to journalistic editors for 'outstanding' contribution.

International Interactions

Belt and Road

Project summary 
The Belt and Road Project is a physical manifestation of China's expansionary foreign policy under leadership of Xi Jingping. The initiative was launched in Kazakhstan at Nazarbayev University and in Indonesia in late 2013. The Belt and Road Initiative is of significance internationally attributed to China's inextricable and transnational economic integration, predominantly through its role in manufacturing but expanding into other industries such as technology.

The Belt and Road Project has three predominant aspects: Overland, Technological, and Maritime. The Overland aspect includes coherent development of routes passing through Russia, Mongolia, the Middle East, Central Asia, Turkey and ending at Europe. The initiative's Maritime manifestation includes control and ability to facilitate trade and movements through the South China Sea, Indian Ocean and towards the Middle East and Europe. Technologically, China has developed satellites, fibre optic cables, communication networks, and has promoted the expansion of Chinese mobile companies to integrate the international community and China more deeply. The Chinese government has launched initiatives to these effects, such as developing railways in the south-east Asian region. China has also worked to influence nations through crafting aid agreements, bilateral trading agreements and establishing free trade with participating and cooperative nations.

All-China Journalists Association and Belt and Road 
The All-China Journalist Association regularly cooperates with the Chinese government and member organisations and journalists to produce content that updates about and promotes the Belt and Road Project. This is exemplified through articles published by the organisation in cooperation with oligarchical Chinese news agencies such as Xinhuanet and China Daily. A report on May 5, 2020, from the organisation in collaboration with China Daily alludes to Russian collaboration through the assertion "we are all in a community of common destiny.”

The Belt and Road Journalists Network 
The Belt and Road Initiative has also enabled the All-China Journalist Society, in collaboration with other members of the Belt and Road Project to create a ‘Belt and Road Journalists Network. The Belt and Road News Network, launched in 2017, encompasses 208 media organisations from over 98 different nations. The Chair of the organisation is China's People's Daily in collaboration with the All-China Journalists Association with the Secretariat located at ‘People's Daily’ in Beijing, China. The first council meeting was held in 2019, in Beijing, China, with over 40 international media organisations present.

This collaboration encompasses multiple media forms, including music, photography and news. Belt and Road News Network activities include collaborative media trips, shared access to news and media archives and databases, collective workshops and training seminars, as well as awards. In September 2019, the Belt and Road News Network held a media workshop in China; over 47 countries were represented and over 100 senior correspondents and senior editors were present.

Belt and Road News Association Charter 
The Charter contains 20 articles espousing collective adherence to ‘peaceful cooperation’ and ‘mutual learning.’

References

External links

Journalism-related professional associations
Organizations established in 1937
1937 establishments in China
Organizations associated with the Chinese Communist Party